The Animas Forks Pioneer was the only newspaper ever published in the mining town of Animas Forks, San Juan County, Colorado. This American English newspaper began publication in 1882 and lasted only four years, ceasing publication in October 1886 when the period of speculative mining ceased.  The publisher was George N. Raymond.  Animas Forks became a ghost town by the 1920s.  The Pioneer printing plant was the highest altitude printing plant in U.S. history.

References

Defunct newspapers published in Colorado
Publications established in 1882
1882 establishments in Colorado
1886 disestablishments in Colorado
San Juan County, Colorado